Richard Calmit Adams (1864-1921), was a member of the Delaware Tribe of Indians. As a Lenape poet and writer he wrote five books of Delaware stories, history, religion, and traditions. He acted as their legal representative in Washington D.C., in the legal battle with the Cherokee Nation over land rights during the era of the Dawes Commission. He also advocated for the rights of individual Indian land holders against large oil companies seeking blanket leases on Indian lands, and was the founder of the Brotherhood of North American Indians.

Notes

Works authored by Richard C. Adams

 "Delaware Indian Legend and the Story of Their Troubles. By Richard C. Adams, Representing the Delaware Indians." Washington DC, 1899.
 "The Ancient Religion of the Delaware Indians and Observations and Reflections." Originally published 1904. Paperback, 86 pages, Published July 21, 2013 by Book on Demand Ltd.
 "Legends of the Delaware Indians and Picture Writing." Originally published 1905. Paperback, 168 pages, Published May 1, 2000 by Syracuse University Press (first published December 1997)
 "The Delaware Indians, a Brief History." Paperback, 74 pages, Published by Hope Farm Press & Bookshop (first published August 31, 2012)

External links
 Delaware Tribe of Indians
 Lenape Talking Dictionary

Delaware Tribe of Indians people
1864 births
1921 deaths
Native American writers
20th-century Native Americans